Jairo Leonard Patiño Rosero (born 5 April 1978) is a Colombian retired professional footballer who played as a midfielder.

Club career
Nicknamed El Viejo, Patiño started his career in 1999 at his hometown club Deportivo Cali. He moved to Atlético Huila in 1999, and then to Deportivo Pasto in 2000. In 2001, he returned to Deportivo Cali, before moving to Argentina in 2003 to join Newell's Old Boys. After impressing in the Argentine Primera División, he was signed by River Plate in 2004 where he stayed until 2006. In January 2005, River Plate turned down a £2.78m offer from English club Crystal Palace, who were then in the Premier League.

He returned to Colombia to play for Atlético Nacional in 2007. In July 2007 he returned again to Argentina when he signed for Banfield. After he joined San Luis F.C. in Mexico. For the 2009–2010 season he went back to Colombia to join Atlético Nacional.

International career
Patiño has been a regular in the Colombia national football team. He was part of the Colombian team that reached the semi final of the 2003 FIFA Confederations Cup which they lost 1-0 to Cameroon. In this game Marc-Vivien Foé collapsed and died and Patiño was the closest player on the pitch to Foé at the time, and was the first to check on his situation.

He was part of the Colombian team that reached the Semi finals of the 2005 CONCACAF Gold Cup in which Colombia lost 3-2 to Panama.

Honours

Individual
 CONCACAF Gold Cup Best XI: 2005

References

External links
 Argentine Primera statistics 

1978 births
Living people
Footballers from Cali
Colombian footballers
2003 FIFA Confederations Cup players
2003 CONCACAF Gold Cup players
2004 Copa América players
2005 CONCACAF Gold Cup players
Categoría Primera A players
Argentine Primera División players
Liga MX players
Deportivo Cali footballers
Atlético Huila footballers
Deportivo Pasto footballers
Newell's Old Boys footballers
Club Atlético River Plate footballers
Atlético Nacional footballers
Club Atlético Banfield footballers
San Luis F.C. players
Llaneros F.C. players
Cúcuta Deportivo footballers
Colombian expatriate footballers
Colombian expatriate sportspeople in Argentina
Colombian expatriate sportspeople in Mexico
Expatriate footballers in Argentina
Expatriate footballers in Mexico
Colombia international footballers
Association football midfielders
Llaneros F.C. managers
Cúcuta Deportivo managers
Colombian football managers
20th-century Colombian people
21st-century Colombian people